The 2018 FIFA World Cup CONCACAF–AFC qualification play-off was a two-legged home-and-away tie between the fourth-placed team from the CONCACAF Fifth Round, Honduras, and the winner of the AFC Fourth Round play-off, Australia.

The matches were played on 10 and 15 November 2017. After a 0–0 draw in the opening leg at Estadio Olímpico Metropolitano, Australia defeated Honduras 3–1 in the second leg at Stadium Australia, winning the tie by the same margin on aggregate. Australia therefore qualified for the 2018 FIFA World Cup finals, reaching the tournament for the fifth time, and fourth in succession.

Overview
The play-off marked the sixth inter-confederation play-off participation for Australia after previously defeating Uruguay in 2005, losing to Uruguay in 2001, losing to Iran in 1997, losing to Argentina after defeating Canada in 1993, and losing to Scotland in 1985. This was also their first play-off appearance as an AFC member.

This was Honduras' first participation in the inter-confederation play-offs; they finished fourth in the final round of the CONCACAF qualification after the United States lost to Trinidad and Tobago 2–1, which caused the United States to not qualify for the World Cup for the first time since 1986.

The draw for the order in which the two matches would be played was held by FIFA on 25 July 2015 at the World Cup Preliminary Draw.

First leg

Second leg

References

External links

Qualifiers, FIFA.com

5
5
Australia national soccer team matches
Honduras national football team matches
World Cup qualification play-off
World Cup qualification play-off
World Cup qualification play-off
FIFA World Cup qualification inter-confederation play-offs
International association football competitions hosted by Honduras
International association football competitions hosted by Australia
November 2017 sports events in North America
FIFA World Cup qualification
Australia at the 2018 FIFA World Cup